Ulmann is a surname. Notable people with the surname include:

Albert Ulmann (born 1861), American banker and author
Benjamin Ulmann (1829–1884), Alsatian-French historical painter
Doris Ulmann (1882–1934), American photographer
Salomon Ulmann (1806–1865), Alsatian-French rabbi

See also
Ullmann

Jewish surnames
Yiddish-language surnames